Dharamaprakasha Rajakarya Prasaktha Bhusanayana Mukundadas Sreenivasaiah was a philanthropist who founded India's first private engineering college BMS College of Engineering in 1946 at B.M.S. Institute of Technology and ManagementBangalore

Awards and honours
He was awarded with the title Dharamaprakasha Rajakarya Prasaktha from the then Maharaja of Mysore in 1946.

References

Indian philanthropists
Year of birth missing
Year of death missing